The 2015 Conference USA baseball tournament will be held from May 20 through 24 at Pete Taylor Park in Hattiesburg, Mississippi.  The annual tournament determines the conference champion of the Division I Conference USA for college baseball.  The tournament champion will receive the league's automatic bid to the 2015 NCAA Division I baseball tournament.

The tournament was established in 1996, Conference USA's first season of play.  Rice has won the most championships, with six.

Seeding and format
The top eight finishers from the regular season will be seeded one through eight.  The tournament will use a double elimination format.

Bracket and results

Conference championship

References

Tournament
Conference USA Baseball Tournament
Conference USA baseball tournament
Conference USA baseball tournament
College sports tournaments in Mississippi
Hattiesburg, Mississippi
Baseball competitions in Mississippi